El Khawa (translated as The Brothers) is an Algerian television series, directed by Madih Belaid. It premiered on May 27, 2017 on El Djazairia One.

Description 
The series revolves around a family mystery, buried for more than 20 years, this mystery was revealed after the death of the father. Who worked as a famous businessman and left a great legacy both inside and outside the country. The series deals with family problems caused by material considerations.

Cast

Overview

References 

تنزيل واتساب الذهبي(in Arabic). Retrieved

Arabic television series
2017 Algerian television series debuts
2010s Algerian television series
El Djazairia One original programming